Armond Arabshahi, known by his stage name Unlike Pluto, is an American singer, songwriter, DJ and record producer. The name Unlike Pluto developed from holding onto his outcast persona. He is known for his Pluto Tapes series of albums, where he challenges himself to release one song per week starting from May 2018. Besides his Unlike Pluto project, he has a side project with Hamilton singer Joanna Jones called Why Mona where they create covers of old school classics.

Arabshahi has also been working on a manga project since 2021, currently naming it Dada Immortal, alongside which he is learning Japanese. This is followed with him launching a discord server in 2019 that got raided, and therefore deleted, back in 2021, after which he made another server, where he had pre-releases on Tuesdays where members got previews of the upcoming song and sometimes more.

Career 
Originally from Atlanta and based in Los Angeles, Arabshahi describes his style of music as electronic rock.

Arabshahi has performed at various music festivals, including Lollapalooza, Bonnaroo, and Euphoria Music Festival. In 2017 he also hosted a tour promoting one of his huge singles, "Everything Black".

The success of the Pluto Tapes lead to Armond releasing songs weekly afterwards, from 2020, 2021, and 2022. In 2022 he plans to release 50 songs for the year.

Why Mona 
In 2017, Arabshahi announced a new side project called Why Mona with Hamilton singer Joanna Jones. The pair released a cover of Queen's "We Will Rock You" the same day. Why Mona combines rock and electronic music to create covers of old school classics. In contrast to Unlike Pluto's electronic driven production, Joanna hails from Broadway where she's currently starring in the roles of Maria Reynolds and Peggy Schuyler in the critically acclaimed Broadway hit musical Hamilton. In early 2019, the duo's cover of "Wannabe" by Spice Girls went viral on TikTok amassing over 10 million unique video creations by users on the platform. In 2021 Dell computers released an ad that featured their track "Rabbit Hole" which introduced a lot of viewers to this song and group.

Like Saturn

In 2020, Arabshahi began another side project called Like Saturn, where he makes lofi chill beats to represent a moment in time.

Discography

Studio albums

Extended plays

Singles

Remixes
 Diplo featuring Faustix and Imanos & Kai – Revolution (2014)

Why Mona singles (covers)

References

Living people
21st-century American musicians
American electronic musicians
Monstercat artists
1991 births